In structural engineering, the Bouc–Wen model of hysteresis is one of the most used hysteretic models typically employed to describe non-linear hysteretic systems. It was introduced by Robert Bouc and extended by Yi-Kwei Wen, who demonstrated its versatility by producing a variety of hysteretic patterns.
This model is able to capture, in analytical form, a range of hysteretic cycle shapes matching the behaviour of a wide class of hysteretical systems. Due to its versatility and mathematical tractability, the Bouc–Wen model has gained popularity. It has been extended and applied to a wide variety of engineering problems, including multi-degree-of-freedom (MDOF) systems, buildings, frames, bidirectional and torsional response of hysteretic systems, two- and three-dimensional continua, soil liquefaction and base isolation systems. The Bouc–Wen model, its variants and extensions have been used in structural control—in particular, in the modeling of behaviour of magneto-rheological dampers, base-isolation devices for buildings and other kinds of damping devices. It has also been used in the modelling and analysis of structures built of reinforced concrete, steel, masonry, and timber.

Model formulation

Consider the equation of motion of a single-degree-of-freedom (sdof) system:

here,  represents the mass,  is the displacement,  the linear viscous damping coefficient,  the restoring force and  the excitation force while the overdot denotes the derivative with respect to time.

According to the Bouc–Wen model, the restoring force is expressed as:

where  is the ratio of post-yield  to pre-yield (elastic)  stiffness,  is the yield force,  the yield displacement, and  a non-observable hysteretic parameter (usually called the hysteretic displacement) that obeys the following nonlinear differential equation with zero initial condition, and that has dimensions of length:

or simply as:

Here the notation used by Song J. and Der Kiureghian A. (2006) is implemented. The restoring force  can be decomposed into an elastic and a hysteretic part as follows:

and

therefore, the restoring force can be visualized as two springs connected in parallel.

For small values of the positive exponential parameter  the transition from elastic to the post-elastic branch is smooth, while for large values that transition is abrupt. Parameters ,  and  control the size and shape of the hysteretic loop. It has been found that the parameters of the Bouc–Wen model are functionally redundant. Removing this redundancy is best achieved by setting .

Definitions

Some terms are defined below: 
 Softening: Slope of hysteresis loop decreases with displacement
 Hardening: Slope of hysteresis loop increases with displacement
 Pinched hysteresis loops: Thinner loops in the middle than at the ends. Pinching is a sudden loss of stiffness, primarily caused by damage and interaction of structural components under a large deformation. It is caused by closing (or unclosed) cracks and yielding of compression reinforcement before closing the cracks in reinforced concrete members, slipping at bolted joints (in steel construction) and loosening and slipping of the joints caused by previous cyclic loadings in timber structures with dowel-type fasteners (e.g. nails and bolts).
 Stiffness degradation: Progressive loss of stiffness in each loading cycle
 Strength degradation: Degradation of strength when cyclically loaded to the same displacement level. The term "strength degradation" is somewhat misleading, since strength degradation can only be modeled if displacement is the input function.

Absorbed hysteretic energy

Absorbed hysteretic energy represents the energy dissipated by the hysteretic system, and is quantified as the area of the hysteretic force under total displacement; therefore, the absorbed hysteretic energy (per unit of mass) can be quantified as

that is,

Energy dissipation is a good measure of cumulative damage under stress reversals; it mirrors the loading history, and parallels the process of damage evolution. In the Bouc–Wen–Baber–Noori model, this energy is used to quantify system degradation.

Modifications to the original Bouc–Wen model

Bouc–Wen–Baber–Noori model

An important modification to the original Bouc–Wen model was suggested by Baber and Wen (1981) and Baber and Noori (1985, 1986).

This modification included strength, stiffness and pinching degradation effects, by means of suitable degradation functions:

The pinching function  is specified as:

where:

When ,  or  no strength degradation, stiffness degradation or pinching effect is included in the model.

Foliente (1993), in collaboration with MP Singh and M. Noori, and later Heine (2001) slightly altered the pinching function in order to model slack systems. An example of a slack system is a wood structure where displacement occurs with stiffness seemingly null, as the bolt of the structure is pressed into the wood.

Two-degree-of-freedom generalization

Consider a two-degree-of-freedom system subject to biaxial excitations. In this case, the interaction between the restoring forces may considerably change the structural response; for instance, the damage suffered from the excitation in one direction may weaken the stiffness and/or strength degradation in the other direction, and vice versa. The equation of motion that models such interaction is given by:

Using this two-degree-of-freedom generalization, Park et al. (1986) represented the hysteretic behaviour of the system by: 

This model is suited, for instance, to reproduce the geometrically-linear, uncoupled behaviour of a biaxially-loaded, reinforced concrete column. Software like ETABS and SAP2000 use this formulation to model base isolators.

Wang and Wen (2000) attempted to extend the model of Park et al. (1986) to include cases with varying 'knee' sharpness (i.e.). However, in so doing, the proposed model was no longer rotationally invariant (isotropic).

Wang and Wen modification

Wang and Wen (1998) suggested the following expression to account for the asymmetric peak restoring force:

where  is an additional parameter, to be determined.

Asymmetrical hysteresis

Asymmetric hysteretical curves appear due to the asymmetry of the mechanical properties of the tested element, of the geometry or of both. Song and Der Kiureghian (2006) proposed the following function for modelling those asymmetric curves:

where:

and

where ,  are six parameters that have to be determined in the identification process. However, according to Ikhouane et al. (2008), the coefficients ,  and  should be set to zero. Aloisio et al. (2020) extended the formulation presented by Song and Der Kiureghian (2006) to reproduce pinching and degradation phenomena. Two additional parameters  and  lead to the pinched load paths, while eight coefficients determine the strength and stiffness degradation.

Calculation of the response, based on the excitation time-histories

and solved using, for example, the Livermore predictor-corrector method, the Rosenbrock methods or the 4th/5th-order Runge–Kutta method. The latter method is more efficient in terms of computational time; the others are slower, but provide a more accurate answer.

The state-space form of the Bouc–Wen–Baber–Noori model is given by:

This is a stiff ordinary differential equation that can be solved, for example, using the function ode15 of MATLAB.

According to Heine (2001), computing time to solve the model and numeric noise is greatly reduced if both force and displacement are the same order of magnitude; for instance, the units kN and mm are good choices.

Analytical calculation of the hysteretic response

The hysteresis produced by the Bouc–Wen model is rate-independent.  can be written as:

where  within the  function serves only as an indicator of the direction of movement. The indefinite integral of  can be expressed analytically in terms of the Gauss hypergeometric function . Accounting for initial conditions, the following relation holds:

Parameter constraints and identification

As noted above, Ma et al.(2004) proved that the parameters of the Bouc–Wen model are functionally redundant; that is, there exist multiple parameter vectors that produce an identical response from a given excitation. Removing this redundancy is best achieved by setting .

Constantinou and Adnane (1987) suggested imposing the constraint  in order to reduce the model to a formulation with well-defined properties.

Determination of the model parameters using experimental input and output data can be accomplished by system identification techniques. The procedures suggested in the literature include:  
 Optimization based on the least-squares method, (using Gauss–Newton methods, evolutionary algorithms, genetic algorithms, etc.); in this case, the error difference between the time histories or between the short-time-Fourier transforms of the signals is minimized.
 Extended Kalman filter, unscented Kalman filter, particle filters
 Differential evolution
 Genetic algorithms
 Particle Swarm Optimization
 Adaptive laws
 Hybrid methods

These parameter-tuning algorithms minimize a loss function that are based on one or several of the following criteria:
 Minimization of the error between the experimental displacement and the calculated displacement.
 Minimization of the error between the experimental restoring force and the calculated restoring force.
 Minimization of the error between the experimental dissipated energy (estimated from the displacement and the restoring force) and the calculated total dissipated energy.

Once an identification method has been applied to tune the Bouc–Wen model parameters, the resulting model is considered a good approximation of true hysteresis, when the error between the experimental data and the output of the model is small enough (from a practical point of view).

Criticism

The hysteretic Bouc–Wen model has received some criticism regarding its ability to accurately describe the phenomenon of hysteresis in materials. Ikhouane and Rodellar (2005) give some insight regarding the behavior of the Bouc–Wen model and provide evidence that the response of the Bouc–Wen model under periodic input is asymptotically periodic.

Charalampakis and Koumousis (2009) propose a modification on the Bouc–Wen model to eliminate displacement drift, force relaxation and nonclosure of hysteretic loops when the material is subjected to short unloading reloading paths resulting to local violation of Drucker's or Ilyushin's postulate of plasticity.

References

Further reading

Materials science
Solid mechanics
Mechanics
Hysteresis